A dorsal gunner, mid-upper gunner or top gunner is an air gunner responsible for operating a gun position or turret located on the upper (dorsal) fuselage, between the cockpit and tail of some military aircraft. 

Between World War I and the 1950s, most heavy bombers, large attack/strike aircraft and long-range maritime patrol aircraft featured a dorsal, mid-upper or top gun position.

During World War II, the mid-upper gunners of British Commonwealth heavy bomber crews were regarded as the primary observer of a crew, and were responsible for detecting the approach of enemy fighter aircraft, as well preventing collisions with friendly aircraft and accidental mid-air bomb strikes.

See also
 Nose gunner
 Tail gunner
 Ventral gunner

References 
 Genevieve Tudor,  2005, BBC – WW2 People's War "Under Attack"
 Australian War Memorial, (no date) Crew - Mid Upper Gunner

Military aviation occupations
Combat occupations